Acrolophus acanthogona is a moth of the family Acrolophidae. It is found in Texas.

References

Moths described in 1919
acanthogona